This page covers all the important events in the sport of tennis in 2009. Primarily, it provides the results of notable tournaments throughout the year on both the ATP and WTA Tours, the Davis Cup, and the Fed Cup.

Changes
The structure of both the WTA and ATP tours has been changed for 2009. On the men's side, Masters Series events have been replaced by Masters 1000 tournaments, while the International Series Gold and International Series tournaments are now 500 Series and 250 Series events respectively. The season-ending ATP World Tour Finals remains unchanged.

On the women's tour, the tiered system which has existed since 1988 has been scrapped in favour of a structure closer to the men's circuit. Tier I and Tier II have been merged form WTA Premier Tournaments. The Tier III and Tier IV have also been merged into International Tournaments. The WTA Tour Championships remains in the schedule but the WTA have also initiated a second season-ending tournament, the Commonwealth Bank Tour of Champions for eight players who did not qualify for the Tour Championships (usually below the top eight in the rankings).

News

January
See: 2009 ATP World Tour, 2009 WTA Tour
 1 January: The season begins a few days earlier than usual with the newly formed Capitala World Tennis Championship in Abu Dhabi. The draw features Roger Federer, Rafael Nadal, James Blake, Nikolay Davydenko, Andy Murray and Andy Roddick.
 4 January: The first official event of the season, the new Brisbane International joint event commences in Australia.
 5 January: Two male events begin in Chennai and Doha, while a women's tournament in Auckland also starts.

February
1 February: Rafael Nadal defeats Roger Federer in five sets to win the Australian Open

March
Rafael Nadal and Andy Murray win the BNP Paribas Open and the Sony Ericsson Open respectively

April
Rafael Nadal wins the Monte-Carlo Rolex Masters, Barcelona Open Banco Sabadell, and the Internazionali BNL d'Italia

May
17 May: Roger Federer overturns a 5 match losing streak to Rafael Nadal by defeating him in straight sets to win the Mutua Madrileña Madrid Open which ended his title drought

June
7 June: Roger Federer ties Pete Sampras's all-time record with the most grand slam singles titles (14) by defeating Robin Söderling in the final to win his first Roland Garros title

July
5 July: Roger Federer defeats Andy Roddick 5–7, 7-6(8), 7-6(5), 3–6, 16–14 to win his 6th Wimbledon title and record 15th Grand Slam singles title

August
 13 August: The top 8 seeds ( Roger Federer, Rafael Nadal, Andy Murray, Novak Djokovic, Andy Roddick, Juan Martín del Potro, Jo-Wilfried Tsonga, Nikolay Davydenko) advance to the quarterfinals of the Rogers Cup, making it the first time in tennis history that the top 8 players in the ATP ranking system made it to the quarterfinals of the same tournament. Jo-Wilfried Tsonga turned around a 1–5 deficit in the third set of the quarterfinals against Roger Federer to win the match before losing to eventual champion Andy Murray
 23 August: Roger Federer wins his sixth ATP World Tour 1000 title defeating Novak Djokovic at the Cincinnati Masters.

September
 14 September: Juan Martín del Potro turns around a 1 set to 2 deficit to upset top ranked defending champion Roger Federer to win the US Open

October

November
 29 November: Nikolay Davydenko defeats all three 2009 Grand Slam Champions en route to winning the Barclays ATP World Tour Finals

ITF

Grand Slam events
Australian Open (19 January – 1 February)
Men's singles: Rafael Nadal def. Roger Federer
Women's singles: Serena Williams def. Dinara Safina
Men's doubles: Bob Bryan / Mike Bryan def. Mahesh Bhupathi / Mark Knowles
Women's doubles: Serena Williams / Venus Williams def. Daniela Hantuchová / Ai Sugiyama
Mixed doubles: Sania Mirza / Mahesh Bhupathi def. Nathalie Dechy / Andy Ram
French Open (24 May – 7 June)
Men's singles: Roger Federer def. Robin Söderling
Women's singles: Svetlana Kuznetsova def. Dinara Safina
Men's doubles: Lukáš Dlouhý / Leander Paes def. Wesley Moodie / Dick Norman
Women's doubles: Anabel Medina Garrigues / Virginia Ruano Pascual def. Victoria Azarenka / Elena Vesnina
Mixed doubles: Liezel Huber / Bob Bryan def. Vania King / Marcelo Melo
Wimbledon Championships (22 June – 5 July)
Men's singles: Roger Federer def. Andy Roddick
Women's singles: Serena Williams def. Venus Williams
Men's doubles: Daniel Nestor / Nenad Zimonjić def. Bob Bryan / Mike Bryan
Women's doubles: Serena Williams / Venus Williams def. Samantha Stosur / Rennae Stubbs
Mixed doubles: Anna-Lena Grönefeld / Mark Knowles def. Cara Black / Leander Paes
US Open (31 August – 13 September)
Men's singles: Juan Martín del Potro def. Roger Federer
Women's singles: Kim Clijsters def. Caroline Wozniacki
Men's doubles: Lukáš Dlouhý / Leander Paes def. Mahesh Bhupathi / Mark Knowles
Women's doubles: Serena Williams / Venus Williams def. Cara Black / Liezel Huber
Mixed doubles: Carly Gullickson / Travis Parrott def. Cara Black / Leander Paes

Davis Cup

World Group Draw

S-Seeded
U-Unseeded
 * Choice of ground

World Group Play-offs

Fed Cup
World Group Draw

 S-Seeded
 U-Unseeded
 * Choice of ground

Final

World Group Play-offs

Date: 25–26 April

Hopman Cup

Final

ATP World Tour
See: 2009 ATP World Tour

Changes in No. 1 rank
1 January – 5 July:  Rafael Nadal
6 July – 31 December:  Roger Federer

ATP World Tour Finals
London, United Kingdom (22 November – 29 November)
Singles Qualifiers:  Rafael Nadal,  Roger Federer,  Andy Murray,  Novak Djokovic,  Juan Martín del Potro,  Andy Roddick,  Nikolay Davydenko,  Fernando Verdasco,  Robin Söderling
Doubles Qualifiers:  Nestor /  Zimonjić,  Bryan /  Bryan,  Dlouhý  /  Paes,  Bhupathi /  Knowles,  Kubot /  Marach,  Čermák /  Mertiňák,  Mirnyi /  Ram,  Fyrstenberg /  Matkowski
Singles Final:  Nikolay Davydenko def.  Juan Martín del Potro
Doubles Final:  Bryan /  Bryan def.  Mirnyi /  Ram

ATP Masters 1000

World Team Cup

Blue Group

Red Group

Serbia vs. Germany

Sony Ericsson WTA Tour
See: 2009 WTA Tour

Changes in No. 1 rank
1 January – 1 February:  Jelena Janković
2 February – 19 April:  Serena Williams
20 April – 11 October:  Dinara Safina
12 October – 25 October:  Serena Williams
26 October – 1 November:  Dinara Safina
2 November – 31 December:  Serena Williams

WTA Tour Championships
Doha, Qatar (27 October – 1 November)

Singles Finals

Singles Round Robin Players:  Safina,  Dementieva,  Kuznetsova,  Azarenka
Singles Alternates:  Zvonareva,  Radwańska

Doubles Final

Doubles Semifinalists:  Stosur/ Stubbs,  S Williams/ V Williams

Tournament of Champions
Bali, Indonesia (4 November – 8 November)
Final:  Aravane Rezaï def.  Marion Bartoli, 7–5, retired

WTA Premier Tournaments

Exhibition Tournaments

Capitala World Tennis Championship

AAMI Kooyong Classic

JB Group Classic

Masters France

Boodles Challenge

International Tennis Hall of Fame
Class of 2008:
Andrés Gimeno, player
Monica Seles, player
Donald Dell, contributor
Robert Walter Johnson, contributor

References

External links
Official website of the Association of Tennis Professionals (ATP)
Official website of the Women's Tennis Association (WTA)
Official website of the International Tennis Federation (ITF)

 
Tennis by year